This is a list of episodes of The Nightly Show with Larry Wilmore hosted by Larry Wilmore from 2015.

2015

January

February

March

April

May

June

July

August

September

October

November

December

Notes

References

External links 
 
 
 

2015 American television seasons
2015